Diana Widmaier Picasso (born March 12, 1974) is a French art historian specialized in modern art, living in Paris.

Life
Diana Widmaier Picasso is the daughter of Maya Widmaier-Picasso, and the maternal granddaughter of Pablo Picasso and Marie-Thérèse Walter. After a Master's degree in private Law (from Paris-Assas University), and a master's degree in art history (from Paris-Sorbonne University)—her thesis was about the art market in France in the seventeenth century—she decided to specialize in old master drawings. She worked on several exhibitions in museums (Metropolitan Museum in New York, Institut Néerlandais in Paris), and later became an expert in old master drawings at Sotheby's in London and Paris for three years. 

She is the co-founder with Roy Sebag and Chief Artistic Officer of a jewelry company called Menē launched in 2017.

Diana Widmaier Picasso is involved in art organizations: Trustee MoMA PS1, New York (since 2009), Trustee Kunst-Werke, Berlin (since 2007), International Council of MoMA, New York (since 2000), Tate International Council, London (since 2005), Visiting Committee of the Metropolitan Museum of Art for the 19th, 20th and 21st century Departments (since 2008), Member of Performing Art committee of the Whitney Museum, New York (since 2013).

She is also involved in non-profit organizations: Girls Inc. (organization that focuses on giving confidence to girls), Elevate New York (youth development program), Chez Bushwick (organization dedicated to the advancement of interdisciplinary art and performance), Education Through Music (organization that provides instruments and music classes in inner city schools).

She has a daughter born in April 2017.

In 2017, she was named Knight of the Ordre des Arts et des Lettres. 
In 2022, she was named Officer of the Ordre des Arts et des Lettres by Rima Abdul Malak.

DWP Editions - Catalogue raisonné 
In 2003, Diana Widmaier Picasso created a research company called DWP Editions and started gathering information on her grandfather’s works. Since 2013, she is working on a catalogue raisonné of Picasso’s sculptures with a team of researchers (Olivia Speer and Claire Rougé). This catalogue will present over 2000 three-dimensional works including materials like plaster, bronze, wood, terra-cotta, cardboard and paper.

Curatorial works
« Maya Ruiz-Picasso, daughter of Pablo », Paris, Musée national Picasso-Paris, April 16 - December 31, 2022
« Picasso: La Scultura », Roma, Galleria Borghese, October 9, 2018 - February 3, 2019
« Picasso and Maya: Father and Daughter », Paris, Gagosian Gallery, October 18 - February 24, 2017
« Desire », Miami, Moore Building, Art Basel Miami Beach, November 30 - December 4, 2016
« Picasso's Picassos: A Selection from the Collection of Maya Ruiz-Picasso », New York, Gagosian Gallery, November 10, 2016 - February 18, 2017
« Picasso.mania », Paris, Galeries nationales du Grand Palais, October 7, 2015 - February 29, 2016
« Picasso and Marie-Thérèse: L'Amour Fou », New York, Gagosian Gallery, April 14 - July 15, 2011

Books 
Diana Widmaier Picasso, Maya Ruiz-Picasso, fille de Pablo, Paris, Skira, 2022
Diana Widmaier Picasso, Philippe Charlier, Picasso Sorcier, Paris, Gallimard NRF, 2022
Diana Widmaier Picasso, Picasso and Maya: Father and Daughter, New York, Gagosian, 2019
Diana Widmaier Picasso, Picasso: The Impossible Collection, New York, Assouline, 2019
Diana Widmaier Picasso, Art Can Only Be Erotic, Munich, Prestel, 2005 .

Essays 
 « Pregnant Woman: In the Work of Louise Bourgeois and Pablo Picasso », Louise Bourgeois & Pablo Picasso, Anatomies of Desire (catalogue de l'exposition), Zürich, Hauser & Wirth, 2019, p. 90-129
 « Picasso and the Revitalization of Sculpture », Picasso: The Sculpture (catalogue of the exhibition), Rome, Galleria Borghese, Milan, Officina Libraria, 2018, p. 18-45
« Picasso and Monumental Sculpture: Chicago, 1963-1967 », Picasso: The Sculpture (catalogue of the exhibition), Rome, Galleria Borghese, Milan, Officina Libraria, 2018, p. 70-85
« Picasso's Sculpture Studio in the Photographs of Edward Quinn », Picasso: The Sculpture (catalogue of the exhibition), Roma, Galleria Borghese, Milan, Officina Libraria, 2018, p. 86-115
(in French) « Picasso et les photographes : d'un objectif à l'autre », Picasso, les années Vallauris (catalogue of the exhibition), Paris, Réunion des musées nationaux, 2018, p. 229-236
(in French) « Vallauris, un terrain d'expérimentations pour la sculpture de Picasso », Picasso, les années Vallauris (catalogue of the exhibition), Paris, Réunion des musées nationaux, 2018, p. 213-227
« Rescue: The end of a year », Picasso 1932: Love, Fame, Tragedy (catalogue of the exposition), London, Tate Gallery Publishing, 2018, p. 208-233
  « Marie-Thérèse Walter, muse de Boisgeloup », Boisgeloup, l'atelier normand de Picasso (catalogue of the exhibition), Rouen, Réunion des musées métropolitains de Rouen-Normandie, Artlys Editions, 2017, p. 80-91
 « PascALEjandro or the third artist », PascALEjandro, Alchemical Androgynous (catalogue of the exhibition), Paris, Actes Sud, 2017
 « I would like to deliver a family secret... », 100 Secrets of the Art World: Everything you always wanted to know about the arts but were afraid to ask, Londres, Koenig Books, 2016, p. 106-107
  « De Rodin à Picasso : la sculpture à travers l'oeil du photographe », Une pensée pour Rodin : d'hier à aujourd'hui, ses admirateurs lui rendent hommage, Paris, Place des Victoires, 2016, p. 67-69
  « Femme aux bras écartés, du carton à la tôle », Picasso.Sculptures (catalogue de l'exposition), Paris, Musée national Picasso-Paris, Somogy, 2016, p. 270-273
 « Picasso and Marie-Thérèse Walter: Erotic Passion and Mystic Union », Picasso: The Artist and his Muses (catalogue de l'exposition), Vancouver, Vancouver Art Gallery, 2016, p. 58-79
 « Picasso Finished/Unfinished », Unfinished: Thoughts left visible (catalogue de l'exposition), New York, The Metropolitan Museum of Art, New Haven, Yale University Press, 2016, p. 188-193
  « Picasso et les arts (cinéma, danse, théâtre et art vidéo) », Picasso.mania (catalogue of the exhibition), Réunion des Musées Nationaux, 2015, pp. 258-261 
  « La sculpture de Picasso et après ... » Picasso.mania (catalogue of the exhibition), Réunion des Musées Nationaux, 2015, pp. 258-261 
 « Réflexions et perspectives contemporaines sur la sculpture monumentale de Picasso à partir d'un document d'archives inédit », Actes du Colloque Revoir Picasso, Colloque international du 25 au 28 mars 2015, Paris, Musée national Picasso-Paris, Grand Palais, 2015 
« Pablo Picasso: a tribute to American collectors », in Transfigurations: Modern Masters from the Wexner Family Collection (catalogue de l'exposition), Columbus, Wexner Center for the Arts, 2014 
« Pablo Picasso's Sheet-Metal Sculptures, Vallauris 1954-1965: Design, Materials and Experimentation », Sylvette, Sylvette, Sylvette. Picasso and the Model (catalogue of the exhibition), Kunsthalle Bremen, Münich, Prestel, 2014, pp. 160–197 
« The Marie-Thérèse Years: a Frenzied Dialogue for the Sleeping Muse, or the Rebirth of Picasso’s Plastic Laboratory », Picasso and Marie-Thérèse: L’Amour fou (catalogue of the exhibition), New York, Gagosian Gallery, Rizzoli International Publications, 2011, pp. 60–97 
« The provenance of Picasso’s Collection of Erotic Japanese Prints », Picasso. Secret Images and the Japanese Erotic Prints, (catalogue of the exhibition), Barcelona, Museu Picasso, Londres, Thames & Hudson, 2009, pp. 90–94 
 « Ambroise Vollard et les sculptures de Picasso » De Cézanne à Picasso. Chefs d’œuvre de la galerie Vollard (catalogue of the exhibition), Paris, Musée d’Orsay, Réunion des Musées Nationaux, 2007, pp. 195–201 
 « Picasso Schaffen für das Theater und die Definition der Skulptur / Picasso’s Creations for the Theatre and the Definition of Sculpture », Picasso und das Theater / Picasso and the Theatre, (catalogue de l’exposition), Francfort, Kunsthalle, Ostfildern, Hatje Cantz Verlag, 2006, pp. 155–163 
 « Picasso und Cranach der Ältere : Kunst als Lebenskraft », Cranach. Gemälde aus Dresden, (catalogue of the exhibition), Chemnitz, Kunstsammlungen, Köln, Wienand Verlag, 2005, pp. 64–76 
 « Préface », Les sculptures de Picasso. Photographies de Brassaï, Paris, Assouline, 2005, pp. 1–3 
« Marie-Thérèse Walter and Pablo Picasso. New Insights into a Secret Love », Pablo Picasso and Marie-Thérèse Walter. Between Classicism and Surrealism, Munster, Graphikmuseum Pablo Picasso, (catalogue of the exhibition), Bielefeld, Kerber Verlag, 2004, pp. 27–35 
« Introduction », The Sculptures of Pablo Picasso (catalogue of the exhibition), New York, Gagosian Gallery, 2003, n. p. 
« The Encounter of Pablo Picasso and Marie-Thérèse Walter (1927): Thoughts on a Historiographical Revision », Picasso et les femmes, (catalogue of the exhibition), Chemnitz, Kunstsammlungen, Köln, 2002, pp. 162–171

References

French art historians
French art curators
1974 births
Living people
Place of birth missing (living people)
Paris-Sorbonne University alumni
Pablo Picasso
French women curators